Empress of Canada may refer to:
 , several ships by the name from the Canadian Pacific Steamship Company
 , a Toronto Harbour cruise ship

See also
 Queen of Canada

Ship names